The Real Boss of the Blues is an album by blues vocalist Joe Turner recorded in 1969 and originally released by the BluesTime label.

Reception

AllMusic reviewer Stephen Thomas Erlewine stated "Turner was roughly 13 years removed from his peak and certainly willing to do whatever it took to get back in the studio and maybe the charts, so he followed producer Thiele through Gene Page arrangements that updated his classic jumpers of the '50s.  ... It's not vintage Turner but it's worthy: it's one of the rare late-'60s blues LPs that feels of its time yet is connected to the past".

Track listing
 "Shake, Rattle and Roll" (Charles Calhoun) − 3:04
 "Lonesome Train" (Traditional) − 2:43
 "Corrine, Corrina" (Traditional) − 3:03
 "How Long, How Long Blues" (Leroy Carr) − 3:20
 "Careless Love" (Traditional) − 2:57
 "Two Loves Have I" (Ted Murrell) − 2:00
 "Honey Hush" (Lou Turner) − 6:36
 "Plastic Man" (Len Chandler) − 10:41

Personnel
Joe Turner − vocals
Unidentified orchestra arranged and conducted by Gene Page

References

1969 albums
Big Joe Turner albums
Albums produced by Bob Thiele
Flying Dutchman Records albums
Albums arranged by Gene Page